Chimoré is a location in the Carrasco Province, Cochabamba Department, Bolivia. It is the seat of the Chimoré Municipality.

Geography

Chimoré is located in the wettest region of the Bolivia, situated in the Amazon rainforests of the Chapare region. While Chimoré experiences a short dry season, rain is plentiful year round, and temperatures are generally warm to hot. The area has a tropical rainforest climate according to the Köppen Classification System.

{{Weather box
|location = Chimoré
|metric first = Y
|single line = Y
|Jan record high C = 38.1
|Feb record high C = 37.8
|Mar record high C = 39.3
|Apr record high C = 38.0
|May record high C = 34.0
|Jun record high C = 32.2
|Jul record high C = 32.0
|Aug record high C = 35.0
|Sep record high C = 36.4
|Oct record high C = 38.4
|Nov record high C = 40.3
|Dec record high C = 38.4
|year record high C = 40.3
|Jan high C = 30.2
|Feb high C = 30.5
|Mar high C = 29.5
|Apr high C = 27.7
|May high C = 24.9
|Jun high C = 23.1
|Jul high C = 23.9
|Aug high C = 27.7
|Sep high C = 29.4
|Oct high C = 29.8
|Nov high C = 30.7
|Dec high C = 31.4
|year high C = 28.2
|Jan mean C = 26.8
|Feb mean C = 26.6
|Mar mean C = 26.2
|Apr mean C = 24.7
|May mean C = 22.8
|Jun mean C = 20.4
|Jul mean C = 21.1
|Aug mean C = 23.0
|Sep mean C = 25.2
|Oct mean C = 26.4
|Nov mean C = 27.1
|Dec mean C = 27.0
|year mean C = 24.8
|Jan low C = 21.3
|Feb low C = 21.3
|Mar low C = 20.5
|Apr low C = 18.9
|May low C = 16.5
|Jun low C = 15.4
|Jul low C = 14.8
|Aug low C = 16.3
|Sep low C = 18.7
|Oct low C = 19.8
|Nov low C = 20.3
|Dec low C = 20.9
|year low C = 18.7
|Jan record low C = 20.4
|Feb record low C = 19.0
|Mar record low C = 19.0
|Apr record low C = 17.5
|May record low C = 15.0
|Jun record low C = 11.0
|Jul record low C = 10.0
|Aug record low C = 14.4
|Sep record low C = 16.7
|Oct record low C = 18.0
|Nov record low C = 18.3
|Dec record low C = 19.0
|year record low C = 10.0
|precipitation colour = green
|Jan precipitation mm = 737.1
|Feb precipitation mm = 764.4
|Mar precipitation mm = 621.6
|Apr precipitation mm = 337.9
|May precipitation mm = 168.4
|Jun precipitation mm = 102.7
|Jul precipitation mm = 87.3
|Aug precipitation mm = 67.5
|Sep precipitation mm = 115.5
|Oct precipitation mm = 220.2
|Nov precipitation mm = 358.8
|Dec precipitation mm = 604.0
|year precipitation mm = 4185.4
|unit precipitation days = 1.0 mm
|Jan precipitation days = 14.0
|Feb precipitation days = 11.1
|Mar precipitation days = 12.7
|Apr precipitation days = 9.4
|May precipitation days = 11.4
|Jun precipitation days = 5.4
|Jul precipitation days = 4.0
|Aug precipitation days = 5.6
|Sep precipitation days = 7.6
|Oct precipitation days = 9.4
|Nov precipitation days = 10.1
|Dec precipitation days = 11.9
|year precipitation days = 111.6
|Jan humidity = 79
|Feb humidity = 79
|Mar humidity = 79
|Apr humidity = 78
|May humidity = 79
|Jun humidity = 78
|Jul humidity = 73
|Aug humidity = 65
|Sep humidity = 64
|Oct humidity = 67
|Nov humidity = 72
|Dec humidity = 77
|year humidity = 74
|source 1 = SENAMHI<ref name = DWD>

Transports 
The city is served by the Chimore Airport .

References

Populated places in Cochabamba Department